Kabekhabl is a rural locality (an aul) in Khatazhukayskoye Rural Settlement of Shovgenovsky District, the Republic of Adygea, Russia. The population was 1,015 as of 2018. There are 14 streets.

Geography 
Kabekhabl is in the steppe zone, on the left bank of the Fars River, 8 km northwest of Khakurinokhabl (the district's administrative centre) by road. Pshicho is the nearest rural locality.

Ethnicity 
The aul is inhabited by Circassians.

References 

Rural localities in Shovgenovsky District